Jackson Township is the name of 2 townships in the U.S. state of South Dakota:

 Jackson Township, Charles Mix County, South Dakota
 Jackson Township, Sanborn County, South Dakota

See also 
 Jackson Township (disambiguation)

South Dakota township disambiguation pages